Mike Mangan is an American keyboard player, vocalist, songwriter, composer and harmonica player from Los Angeles, California, United States, who specializes in the Hammond B3 Organ. Mangan is known for his percussive playing technique and his use of effects pedals on the Hammond Organ.

Mike Mangan is the current Keyboardist & Back Up Vocalist in The Cult. Mangan is also known for his bands 'Big Organ Trio', which he formed in Los Angeles, CA in 2003, and 'Rebel House Radio', which he formed in 2015. Mangan also currently plays with Gilby Clarke in his band 'The Keef Richards' and is the former touring Hammond Organist for Glenn Hughes. 

Big Organ Trio is an instrumental power trio consisting of Hammond B3 Organ, electric Bass, and Drums.  The trio showcases Mangan's improvised soloing and use of effects pedals on the organ, most notably the wah-wah pedal. 

In 2006 Mangan's trio was signed to P-Vine Records via Velour Records and subsequently toured Japan in 2007.  In 2009 the band was officially renamed "Mike Mangan's Big Organ Trio".

Rebel House Radio is a rock band consisting of Hammond Organ, Guitar, Bass, and Drums. Mangan is the lead vocalist, keyboardist, harmonica player and songwriter.

Mangan has also played with Keith Emerson, Marc Ford, Particle, Papa Grows Funk, and has opened for bands and artists such as Robby Krieger, Leo Nocentelli, Melvin Seals and the Jerry Garcia Band, Dr. Lonnie Smith, Mike Clark, Paul Jackson, Robben Ford, Stanton Moore, Umphrey's McGee, Karl Denson,  Benevento/Russo Duo, The New Mastersounds, and Will Bernard.

Mangan has performed at events such as 10,000 Lakes Music Festival, Fillmore Jazz Festival, Squaw Valley Funk Fest, Topanga Earth Day Festival, and Japan Jazz/Funk Expo and has received reviews in publications such as Keyboard Magazine.

Discography
 Big Organ Trio - (independent release), 2005 [with Big Organ Trio]
 Big Organ Trio - (Japanese release) P-Vine/Velour Records, 2007 [with Big Organ Trio]
 Unwound - P-Vine Records, 2010 [with Mike Mangan's Big Organ Trio]
 Return Of Jazz Funk: Jazzfunk Never Dies - P-Vine Records, 2011 [with Big Organ Trio]

References

Sources
 Official Hammoond Organ Co USA Artist Page
 Chris Clark, "Jambands.com" July 24, 2007
 Nancy Bianconi, "Nohoartsdistrict.com' July 5, 2010
 Organ Trio, Wikipedia
 Pinball Number Count, Wikipedia

External links
 Mike Mangan Official website
 Mike Mangan's Big Organ Trio Facebook page

Jazz-funk organists
Year of birth missing (living people)
Living people
21st-century organists